The 2010 Gran Turismo D1 Grand Prix series will be the tenth anniversary season for the D1 Grand Prix series and the fifth for the D1 Street Legal spinoff series. The series begins March 27, 2010 at Odaiba Parking in Tokyo for the D1GP and April 17 for D1SL at Bihoku Highland Circuit. The series will conclude altogether on October 17 as a D1GP Exhibition match at Fuji Speedway.

Schedule

Results

Round 1

Round 2

Round 3

Round 4

Round 5

Round 6

Round 7

External links
 D1GP

D1 Grand Prix seasons
D1 Grand Prix
2010 in Japanese motorsport